Mathias Kneissl is a 1971 West German drama film directed by Reinhard Hauff. It was entered into the 7th Moscow International Film Festival.

Cast
 Hans Brenner as Mathias Kneißl
 Ruth Drexel as Res Kneißl, Mathias' Mutter
 Eva Mattes as Katharina Kneißl
 Hanna Schygulla as Mathilde Schreck
 Frank Frey as Alois Kneißl
 Péter Müller as Michl Pascolini, Bruder der Res
 Andrea Stary as Cilli Kneißl
 Kelle Riedl as Johann Patsch
 Alfons Scharf as Vater Kneißl
 Gustl Bayrhammer as Mühlbauer
 Rainer Werner Fassbinder as Flecklbauer

References

External links
 

1971 films
1970s biographical drama films
German biographical drama films
West German films
1970s German-language films
Films directed by Reinhard Hauff
Films set in Bavaria
Biographical films about bandits
Films set in the 1890s
Films set in 1900
Films set in 1901
Films set in 1902
Films set in the Alps
1971 drama films
1970s German films